Daksinajar Naradhirajbutri (18 September 1852 – 13 September 1906) was a consort of her half-brother Chulalongkorn, the King of Siam.

She was a member of Siamese royal family and a daughter of King Mongkut and Chan Suksathit, one of Mongkut's concubines.

References 

1852 births
1906 deaths
Thai princesses consort
19th-century Thai women
20th-century Thai women
19th-century Chakri dynasty
20th-century Chakri dynasty
People from Bangkok
Thai female Phra Ong Chao
Children of Mongkut
Daughters of kings